Rasam Pagri (रसम पगड़ी) is a social ceremony, prevalent amongst Hindus from northern part of India. The ceremony is conducted upon the death of the eldest male member in a family, in which the eldest surviving male member of the family ties a turban (pagri) on his head in the presence of the extended family or clan. According to the Hindu traditions, the ceremony is usually performed by the father of the wife of the eldest, surviving male member. The ceremony usually takes place on the fourth day from the day of funeral rites (Antim Sanskar, also known as Uthala), or on the thirteenth day, Tehravin. The turban signifies honor of the family, and the ceremony signifies the transition of responsibility for the protection and welfare of the family from the deceased to the surviving oldest male member. (While this is predominantly the case, in the Hindu religious scriptures, it is actually the male member who "gives fire" to the body of the deceased who is entitled to wear the turban. As per tradition, it is the oldest surviving son who performs this final rite.)

Etymology
Rasam means ceremony in different languages of India, including Hindi, the most widely spoken. It is derived from the Arabic word rasm meaning procedure or method. Rasam Pagri literally means the ceremony of the turban.

Reform movements
Some communities have decided to end the custom of Rasam Pagri because it is associated with mrityu-bhoj (feast marking the end of the mourning period).

In some reform-minded families, the daughters have been given the Pagri.

See also
 Hindu genealogy registers at Haridwar

References

External links
 Turban as a Symbol of Responsibility 

Death customs
Death in India
Indian culture
Death in Pakistan
Pakistani culture
Hindu traditions
Sikh practices
Hindi words and phrases
Turbans